Throughout DC Comics history, the mythos of the fictional Wonder Womans has changed dramatically. This list identifies some comics creators who made notable contributions with enduring impact.

Creators of Wonder Woman

 Olive Byrne — co-creator and developer (uncredited)

Notable contributors

Writers

Artists

See also
Wonder Woman
List of Batman creators
List of Superman creators
List of Green Lantern creators

References 

Lists of comics creators
Creators